Metrosideros ochrantha is a species of plant in the family Myrtaceae.

This small tree is endemic to Fiji and is restricted to Mt Kasi and its vicinity on Vanua Levu. It occurs in dense low forest between 300 and 430 m.

Sources
 Europeana: Europe's cultural collections. Listing for Metrosideros ochrantha A.C.Sm. Accessed 5 November 2012.

References

ochrantha
Trees of Fiji
Endemic flora of Fiji
Vulnerable plants
Taxonomy articles created by Polbot